Lavell Webb (born August 31, 1975) known by his stage name City Spud, is an American rapper and record producer. He was a member of hip hop group St. Lunatics. He was featured on fellow St. Lunatic member Nelly's hit single "Ride wit Me" from Nelly's debut album Country Grammar. In November 1999, he was sentenced to 10 years in prison for armed robbery at the Boonville Correctional Center. St. Lunatics campaigned for his release and titled their debut album Free City to support the release of City Spud from prison. He was released from prison, after serving 9 years, in 2008.

Early life
Webb was raised in a Christian household by his mother Donna, grandmother Regina and step-grandfather John, where they often attended church together. He started off as the drummer in the church choir and went on to play drums and percussion in his elementary, middle, and high school bands. The family bought him drums and keyboards to practice on for home use.

Career
With years of experience on the drums, Webb transitioned to beat production. Many of the melodies and instrumentals used on the 2000 album Country Grammar were composed by Webb and Jay E. This was the last of Webb's contributions to music for nearly a decade, while incarcerated Webb continued to collect royalties. The St. Lunatics would rarely visit him but would make the effort for phone calls as the group was frequently touring at the time and the following year on the 2001 album Free City, the group paid homage to Webb by naming the album after him.

In 2023 Webb performed Hot In Herre with Nelly at the 2023 Grammy Awards for the '50 Years of Hip-Hop' showcase.

Legal issues
Webb was a small time marijuana dealer as a young adult. After quitting his job at a Mcdonald's in North County, he was low on cash. Webb and a conspirator came up with the plan to intend to sell marijuana to someone but with the intent to rob them instead. On the night of April 15, 1999 after Webb had set up the meeting over the phone he joined the partner in parking at a 7-11 convenience store around the corner from where the buyer lived, the partner solely robbed the victim while Webb stayed in the car. The outcome of the robbery led to the victim only having $30 to offer. The victim was shot five times in the back, and suffered from life long intestinal issues and use of his left hand as a result of the altercation. During the robbery Webb had stayed in the car. The local police force had questioned Webb's grandparents after the incident, and Nelly ended up taking Webb to the station to confess. Webb was charged with first degree robbery, one count of first degree assault, and two counts of armed criminal action. Despite only being a first time offender the state of Missouri's law to serve out minimum 85% of a sentence went active on Webb. The gunman had not been charged as of 2001 two years after the incident, as he was masked and the weapon used went missing.

Discography

Mixtapes 
 Twelve-12 (2010)

Collaborative albums 
 Free City  (2001)
 Who's the Boss  (2006)

Singles

Featured singles 
2000: "Ride wit Me"

Guest appearances 
 2008: "My Life" 
 2009: "Donk Dat" 
 2010: "Giving Her the Grind" 
 2011: "Yousa Lame" 
 2012: "Go" 
 2014: "I Could Neva" 
 2021: "Ms. Drive Me Crazy"

References

External links
 Official Twitter

1975 births
Living people
African-American male rappers
American prisoners and detainees
Rappers from St. Louis
St. Lunatics members
Midwest hip hop musicians
Place of birth missing (living people)
21st-century American rappers
21st-century American male musicians
American people convicted of robbery
21st-century African-American musicians
20th-century African-American people